Melanocoris nigricornis is a species of minute pirate bug in the family Anthocoridae. It is found in North America.

References

Further reading

 

Anthocoridae
Articles created by Qbugbot
Insects described in 1921